The 1905–06 Wyoming Cowboys basketball team represented the University of Wyoming during the 1905–06 college basketball season. Coached by W. Yates in his and the team's second season, the Cowboys went 3–2.

References

Wyoming
Wyoming Cowboys basketball seasons
Wyoming Cowboys basketball team
Wyoming Cowboys basketball team